The twelfth and final season of Two and a Half Men premiered on October 30, 2014. It was announced that a one-hour series finale of the show would air on February 19, 2015, with the number of episodes aired being 262. The season brought the show back to the way it originally began: two dissimilar men working together to raise a child.

Production
Two and a Half Men was renewed for a twelfth season on March 13, 2014. It was announced on May 14, 2014 that it would be the final season of the show, making it one of the longest running live-action sitcoms on American television.

At the executive session panel at the Television Critics Association press tour in Beverly Hills on June 19, 2014, CBS President Nina Tassler announced the story arc for the season. During this season, which was described by Tassler as a season-long event to conclude the show by Chuck Lorre, Walden (Ashton Kutcher) would experience a health scare in the opening episode and, "he wants to find a way to add more meaning to his life, so he decides he wants to adopt a child and in doing so, he starts the process and realizes that it's very difficult to adopt a child as a single, straight man," Tassler said. "So once and for all he decides, 'I'm going to propose to Alan (Jon Cryer) and we're going to get married and adopt a child as a gay couple."

Show producer Chuck Lorre explained the future gay wedding as bringing the show to a full circle. Lorre said that the marriage would be about raising a child with 'a great deal of love' and not their sexuality. "You're going to see two men who are not gay but are going to raise a child with a great deal of love and attention. Their sexuality is irrelevant to loving and caring for a child, which maybe that's the big story that we wind up telling: taking a kid out of the system and giving him a home. What's better than that?" he added. He promised that there would be a wedding and hoped no offense would be taken. Lorre said that "this seems like the next logical step. Not romance, not sex, raising a child."
Jon Cryer was reluctant to do the storyline when he first heard it, but was convinced when it was explained to him, further insisting the show was not mocking same-sex marriage, and instead would do it 'tastefully'. He also said, "Obviously we've cheapened plenty of things over the decade that we've been on the air. But that is something we're not intending to do."
Cryer was vocally supportive of the storyline and the season, saying "it will be a heartfelt journey...there might be more of a heart to this season than ever before."

Charlie's daughter Jenny (Amber Tamblyn), who was introduced in season 11 as the new 'half man', appears in only three episodes this season.

Along with other sitcoms, this season aired from late October instead of the traditional September season starting month. This was because of Thursday Night Football. To avoid competition with the sporting event, some shows were held back until after its conclusion so the ratings would not be hurt.

Charlie Sheen, who was a previous cast member on the show, expressed his interest to reprise his role of the deceased character Charlie Harper in the series finale, and even stated that the producers liked the idea, "I've reached out to them and they've reached back," and added that he was "just a meeting away," from making it happen. Producers denied the statements, however, saying that no discussions had been made. Nina Tassler has said that there were no plans to have him back. In December, Sheen publicly criticized Lorre, nearly four years after first doing so saying, "Here's what sucks. I got clearance from the whole cast. Les Moonves. All the suits. There's one guy who's blocking it, guess who that is?" He even told Lorre to "get out of his own way." During an appearance on The Ellen DeGeneres Show on December 12, 2014, Ashton Kutcher refused to confirm whether Sheen would return for the finale, but gave provocative hints on the matter. Sheen posted a bitter, angry critique about the show on Twitter in January 2015. Despite this, at the Television Critics Association's winter press tour on January 15, 2015, Chuck Lorre spoke about the show and praised Sheen, "It would be inappropriate to not acknowledge the extraordinary success we had with Charlie and how grateful I am, we all are, to his contributions. And there's nothing but great feelings for the eight-and-a-half years we worked together." He said he wanted the finale to honour both eras of the show, and that there were "no wounds," following what happened with Sheen, saying "What happened, happened. And I'm grateful for the time we enjoyed working together and I'm very grateful Ashton came along and kept the lights on. What do I got to complain about? I'm so blessed."

On December 5, 2014, it was announced that the series finale would be on February 19, 2015, and it would be an hour long episode to conclude the series. CBS announced that the new incarnation of The Odd Couple, the premise of which Two and a Half Men was based on, would take its place for the remainder of the television season.

Cast

Main
 Ashton Kutcher as Walden Schmidt
 Jon Cryer as Alan Harper
 Conchata Ferrell as Berta
 Edan Alexander as Louis

Recurring
 Holland Taylor as Evelyn Harper
 Amber Tamblyn as Jenny
 Melanie Lynskey as Rose
 Courtney Thorne-Smith as Lyndsey McElroy
 Maggie Lawson as Ms. McMartin, the social worker
 Deanna Russo as Laurel
 Michael Bolton as himself
 Ryan Stiles as Herb Melnick

Guest

 Jennifer Taylor as Chelsea
 April Bowlby as Kandi
 Emmanuelle Vaugier as Mia
 Marin Hinkle as Judith Harper-Melnick
 Max Mittelman as Mechanical Demon
 Aisha Tyler as Allison, an adoption lawyer
 Clark Duke as Barry Foster
 D. B. Sweeney as Larry Martin
 Mimi Rogers as Robin Schmidt
 Alessandra Torresani as Kathy
 Jessica Lu as Jean
 Laura Stone as Danielle
 Brenda Koo as Julie
 Richard Riehle as Santa
 Bill Smitrovich as Rick
 Gary Anthony Williams as Leo
 David Denman as Jack
 Vernee Watson as Karen
 Angus T. Jones as Jake Harper
 Arnold Schwarzenegger as Lt. Wagner
 Missi Pyle as Mrs. Pasternak
 Judy Greer as Bridget
 Sophie Winkleman as Zoey
 John Stamos as himself
 Christian Slater as himself
 Bob Bergen as Porky Pig (cartoon sequence)
 Chuck Lorre as himself

Episodes

Critical reception
Two and a Half Men, a show that has always generated controversy, continued to do so in its final season. The producers were aware that the story line for the season might cause controversy (despite saying that was not their intention), which it did. However, Nina Tassler defended the show, saying "I think it's a very positive statement," "[Walden believes he is] going to adopt a child as a gay couple, and the reality is he can do that. In a universe where at one point you couldn't do that, and now you can, I think that's a much more positive statement that he's making."

Ciara Doll of "The IDS Newspaper" criticized the beginning of the season, saying that it "felt flat".
Jillian Page of Montreal Gazette praised the overall story arc for the season, believing the story was "redefining marriage" in the real world. He believed Chuck Lorre to be a "genius", for "turning convention upside down". He believed the story line to be a "warm", and "noble" one. Jim Slotek of Niagara Falls Review was positive that the show was trying to "make sense again in its final season" in terms of bringing the show back to where it started, two men trying to raise a young child.

Ratings

U.S. Nielsen and DVR ratings

Notes

References

General references 
 
 
 

Season 12
2014 American television seasons
2015 American television seasons